Sphaerolaimidae is a family of nematodes belonging to the order Monhysterida.

Genera:
 Buccolaimus Allgén, 1959
 Doliolaimus Lorenzen, 1966
 Hofmaenneria W.Schneider, 1940
 Metasphaerolaimus Gourbault & Boucher, 1981
 Parasphaerolaimus Ditlevsen, 1918
 Sphaerolaimus Bastian, 1865
 Subsphaerolaimus Lorenzen, 1978

References

Nematodes